Al-Nassr defended the championship and claimed their 6th championship, although the Saudi FA rules stipulated that both teams in the championship final had to play away, so although both finalists are from Riyadh, the final was in Jeddah. Al Nassr had four coaches during the season. Youssouf Khamis was the lucky one to win the final, following the successive sackings of Henri Michel, Ivo Borkibo and Nasser Jawhar.

Stadia and locations

Final league table

Playoffs

Semifinals

Third place match

Final

External links 
 RSSSF Stats
 Saudi Arabia Football Federation
 Saudi League Statistics

Saudi Premier League seasons
Saudi Professional League
Professional League